Olev Eskola (until 1934 Olaf Esperk; 18 November 1914 Tallinn – 4 April 1990 Kassari, Hiiu County) was an Estonian actor.

Eskola was born in Tallinn. His older brother was actor Ants Eskola. From 1931 until 1935, and again from 1944 until 1949, he worked at the Estonia Theatre; from 1935 until 1944 and again from 1950 until 1966 at Estonian Drama Theatre; and from 1966 until 1969 in the Estonian Youth Theatre. Since 1969 he was a freelance actor. Besides theatre roles he has also had a long career in films. Eskola was married to actress Helle Raa.

Filmography

 1955 Jahid merel
 1964: Põrgupõhja uus Vanapagan
 1967: Blasted Hell 
 1969: Gladiaator
 1970: Kolme katku vahel
 1974: Ohtlikud mängud 
 1975: Indrek
 1981: Karge meri
 1985: Bande

References

1914 births
1990 deaths
Male actors from Tallinn
People from Kreis Harrien
Estonian male stage actors
Estonian male film actors
Estonian male television actors
Estonian male radio actors
20th-century Estonian male actors